Alexie Glass-Kantor (née Glass) is an Australian artist and gallery director.  she is the Executive Director of Artspace Visual Arts Centre in Sydney.

Early life and education
Alexie Glass was born in Sydney, New South Wales

Glass-Kantor received a Bachelor of Art Theory (Hons) degree in 1999 from the University of New South Wales.

Career

In 2006, Glass-Kantor was appointed director and senior curator of Gertrude Contemporary Art Spaces in Melbourne.

She was a director on the board of the National Association for the Visual Arts from 2010 to 2014.  
 
In 2012, with Natasha Bullock, Glass-Kantor co-curated Parallel Collisions, the 12th Adelaide Biennial of Australian Art at the Art Gallery of South Australia in Adelaide, South Australia.

In November 2013,she was appointed Executive Director of Artspace Sydney, where she retains the position .

In 2014, Glass-Kantor was invited to curate Encounters at Art Basel Hong Kong. Later that year, she was invited as guest judge for the churchie national emerging art prize in Brisbane.

Since 2015, Glass-Kantor has been the chair of Contemporary Art Organisations Australia (CAOA).

She serves or served on the MCAD Advisory Board for De La Salle College of Saint Benilde, Manila, Philippines.

 she is the arts industry representative of the Academic Board of the National Art School in Sydney.

In 2021 Glass-Kantor was appointed curator for Australia's 2022 representation at the 59th International Art Exhibition of the Venice Biennial, to be presented by artist Marco Fusinato.

References

Living people
Australian art curators
Cultural historians
Year of birth missing (living people)
Australian women curators